Gateway to the West is a nickname that may refer to:

Australia
 Fremantle

Canada
 Winnipeg, Manitoba
 Port Arthur, Ontario
 Thunder Bay, Ontario
 Sudbury, Ontario

China
 Chongqing Municipality

United States
 Lyons, Illinois
 Fort Wayne, Indiana
 St. Louis, Missouri
 Gateway Arch in St. Louis
 A themed area in Six Flags St. Louis, Eureka, Missouri
 Omaha, Nebraska
 Fargo, North Dakota
 Bridgeport, Ohio
 Pittsburgh, Pennsylvania, (see History of Pittsburgh)
 Kemmerer, Wyoming
 The mountain formation known as Cumberland Gap